Southern Pacific 2706 is a 2-8-0 "Consolidation" Class C-8 steam locomotive built by the Baldwin Locomotive Works in 1904 for the Southern Pacific Transportation Company (SP). It is one of three surviving members of its class, and one of many preserved SP 2-8-0s.

History
2706 was retired along with the remaining Southern Pacific steam fleet in the late 1950s at the Bayshore Yard near Brisbane, California. After retirement, it was moved to Watsonville in 1962, and it was purchased by Rick Hammond and the Eccles and eastern railroad company it was moved to Santa Cruz on the day of the 1989 Loma Prieta earthquake, where it was purchased by John Manley in 1999 (from Mike Hart) and subsequently moved to Colusa in 2007. Previously, Manley had worked on the team which restored SP 2467.

A new shop was constructed in 2012 to accommodate work on 2706.

See also 
 Southern Pacific 2718
 Southern Pacific 2579 - a similar locomotive.

References

External links 

 
 
 

2706
Baldwin locomotives
2-8-0 locomotives
Railway locomotives introduced in 1904
Preserved steam locomotives of California